Pietro Campana (1727–1765) was a Spanish engraver.

He was born at Soria in Spain. He trained with Rocco Pozzi, and lived the greater part of his life at Rome and Venice.  He engraved the following prints: St. Francis of Paola after Sebastiano Conca, Portrait of Pietro da Cortona; a picture in the St. Peter delivered from Prison after Mattia Preti; Portrait of Bernardino Barbatelli called Poccetti. He engraved a map of Rome (1748) for Giovanni Battista Nolli.

References

1727 births
1765 deaths
People from Soria
18th-century engravers
Spanish engravers
Italian engravers
Italian Baroque painters